American pop singer Fletcher has released one studio album, three extended plays and twenty-five singles.

Studio albums

Extended plays

Singles

As lead artist

As featured artist

Guest appearances

Other charted songs

References

Discographies of American artists
Pop music discographies